Greg MacArthur (born 1970 in Lindsay, Ontario) is a Canadian playwright. A graduate of Ryerson University's theatre school, he is known for plays including girls! girls! girls!, Snowman, Get Away, Recovery, Tyland, The Toxic Bus Incident and The Missionary Position.

His play The Rise and Fall of Peter Gaveston appears in the Sky Gilbert-edited anthology Perfectly Abnormal: Seven Gay Plays, published by Playwrights Canada Press in 2006, alongside plays by Harry Rintoul, Shawn Postoff, Christian Lloyd, Greg Kearney, Ken Brand and Michael Achtman.

MacArthur was a shortlisted nominee for the Siminovitch Prize in Theatre in 2011. At the 2011 Governor General's Awards, Maryse Warda won the Governor General's Award for English to French translation for her translation of The Toxic Bus Incident.

References

1970 births
21st-century Canadian dramatists and playwrights
Canadian male dramatists and playwrights
Canadian LGBT dramatists and playwrights
Canadian gay writers
People from Kawartha Lakes
Writers from Ontario
Toronto Metropolitan University alumni
Living people
21st-century Canadian male writers
Gay dramatists and playwrights
21st-century Canadian LGBT people